Thyrocarpus is a genus of flowering plants belonging to the family Boraginaceae.

Its native range is Central China to Vietnam, Korea, Taiwan.

Species:
 Thyrocarpus cuifengensis S.S.Ying 
 Thyrocarpus glochidiatus Maxim. 
 Thyrocarpus sampsonii Hance

References

Boraginaceae
Boraginaceae genera